Robert Mizrachi (born November 24, 1978 in Sunny Isles Beach, Florida) is an American professional poker player.

Robert Mizrachi was a  poker dealer at a South Miami casino. He introduced the game of poker to his younger brother, World Poker Tour champion Michael "The Grinder" Mizrachi.
Robert also has two other younger brothers, Michael’s twin Eric Mizrachi who is also a poker player and his youngest brother Donnie Mizrachi, who is a professional magician.

Mizrachi won his first bracelet in the 2007 World Series of Poker in the $10,000 World Championship Pot Limit Omaha event, winning $768,889.

At the 2010 WSOP Main Event, Mizrachi finished in 116th place, winning $57,102. He was one of four brothers who each cashed at the same event.

At the 2014 WSOP, Mizrachi won his second bracelet in the inaugural $1,500 Dealer's Choice Six-Handed event, defeating Aaron Schaff heads-up to earn $147,092.

As of 2016, Mizrachi's live tournament winnings exceed $5,500,000. His 39 cashes at the WSOP account for $2,421,310 of those winnings.

World Series of Poker bracelets

References

External links
World Poker Tour profile

1978 births
World Series of Poker bracelet winners
American poker players
Living people
American people of Iraqi-Jewish descent
Iraqi Jews
People from Sunny Isles Beach, Florida